Corwin Township may refer to the following townships in the United States:

 Corwin Township, Logan County, Illinois
 Corwin Township, Ida County, Iowa
 Corwin Township, Warren County, Ohio, former name of Salem Township, Warren County, Ohio